Murugan Satchithanandan (Murugan Sachiththanantha) (born 22 August 1957) is a Sri Lankan politician, former member of the Parliament of Sri Lanka and former government minister.

References

Sri Lankan Tamil politicians
1957 births
Living people
Members of the 13th Parliament of Sri Lanka
Government ministers of Sri Lanka
United National Party politicians
United People's Freedom Alliance politicians
Sri Lankan Hindus
Deputy chairmen of committees of the Parliament of Sri Lanka